Marlhes is a commune in the Loire department in central France.

Population

|

Twin towns
Marlhes is twinned with:

  Féouda, Togo
  Charette, Quebec, Canada

Personalities
Marcellin Champagnat, catholic saint and founder of the Marist Brothers, was born in the village.

See also
Communes of the Loire department

References

Communes of Loire (department)